Rhinelandic is a term occasionally used for linguistic varieties of a region on both sides of the Middle and Lower Rhine river in Central West Germany, Belgium, the Netherlands, and Luxembourg. It has at least two distinct meanings which often can only be determined from the fine grain context in which the term is used. (This could be complicated at times since in German publications, local languages of villages or cities are commonly referred to as "the dialects" or "dialect", whereas the regiolects, which are dialects of Low German or High German in a linguistic sense, are hardly called so, but referred to using terms like "Rhinelandic", "Hessian," or "Bavarian", etc., that also name large compounds of related local languages
) One of the meanings of Rhinelandic is that of a group of local languages in an area called the Rhineland. Another meaning is that of the regiolect being used by the people approximately of the same area.

Rhinelandic Local Languages  
Rhinelandic is used for a collection of local languages and their varieties in Germany, Belgium, the Netherlands, and Luxembourg, including some varieties of the Limburgish language group (of which Bergish is a subgroup), South Guelderish or Cleverlands (of which East Bergish is a subgroup), Moselle Franconian, and Ripuarian (which includes South Bergish as a subgroup, that is also referred to as East Ripuarian).

Its northern areas are also covered by the more modern term of Meuse-Rhenish, which exclusively refers to the Low Franconian varieties, that are Limburgish including Bergish, and South Guelderish including East Bergish.

The eastern areas in the North are also said to speak Bergish, a term which has its roots in political history and regional pride rather than linguistic similarities. Likewise, the Eifel inhabitants say, they were speaking Eifelplatt, while linguists rather refer to the Ripuarian varieties of the North, and the Moselle-Frankonian ones of the South of the Eifel.

All these local languages and local language groups existed long before Standard German, and developed in parallel since the latter came into existence.

Rhinelandic Regiolect 

Contrasting the collective term Rhinelandic, that encompasses a wide variety of largely mutually incomprehensible local languages having a long history, also the Regiolect of the Rhineland, geographically roughly coinciding with the former Prussian Rhine Province, is being called Rhinelandic. It is of comparatively recent origin, and derives from Standard German but takes some lexical and grammatical and phonetic features of the local languages up, that Standard German normally does not have. Most of those features are not used in other German regiolects, and are often hardly or not understood in other regiolect areas.

See also
Cooperative Dictionary of the Rhinelandic Colloquial Language
Rhinelandic Rhyming Bible
Rhinelandic Regiolect (in the German Wikipedia)
Eifelplatt (in the German Wikipedia)
Rheinischer Fächer (in the German Wikipedia)

References 

Low Franconian languages
Ripuarian language
Central German languages